Salesforce, Inc. is an American cloud-based software company headquartered in San Francisco, California. It provides customer relationship management (CRM) software and applications focused on sales, customer service, marketing automation, e-commerce, analytics, and application development.

Founded by former Oracle executive Marc Benioff, Salesforce quickly grew into one of the largest companies in the world, making its IPO in 2004. Salesforce's continued growth makes it the first cloud computing company to reach US$1billion in annual revenue by fiscal year 2009, and the world's largest enterprise software firm by 2022.

Today, Salesforce is one of the largest technology companies in the world, and as of September 19, 2022, is the 61st largest company in the world by market cap with a value of nearly US$153 billion. Salesforce ranked 136th on the most recent edition of the Fortune 500, making US$26.5billion in 2022. Since 2020, Salesforce has also been a component of the Dow Jones Industrial Average.

History

Salesforce was founded in 1999 by former Oracle executive Marc Benioff, together with Parker Harris, Dave Moellenhoff, and Frank Dominguez as a software as a service (SaaS) company. Two of Salesforce's earliest investors were Larry Ellison, the co-founder and first CEO of Oracle, and Halsey Minor, the founder of CNET.

Salesforce was severely affected by the dot-com bubble bursting at the beginning of the new millennium, with the company laying off 20% of its workforce. Despite its losses, Salesforce continued strong during the early 2000s. Salesforce also gained notability during this period for its "the end of software" tagline and marketing campaign, in which it also hired actors to hold up signs with its slogan outside a Siebel Systems conference. Salesforce's revenue continued to increase from 2000 to 2003, with 2003's revenue skyrocketing from $5.4 million in the fiscal year 2001 to over $100 million by December 2003.

Also in 2003, Salesforce held its first annual Dreamforce conference in San Francisco. In June 2004, the company had its initial public offering on the New York Stock Exchange under the stock symbol CRM and raised US$110 million. In 2006, Salesforce launched IdeaExchange, a platform that allows customers to connect with company product managers.

In 2009, Salesforce passed $1 billion in annual revenue. Also, in 2009, the company launched Service Cloud, an application that helps companies manage service conversations about their products and services.

In 2014, the company released Trailhead, a free online learning platform. In October 2014, Salesforce announced the development of its Customer Success Platform. In September 2016, Salesforce announced the launch of Einstein, an artificial intelligence platform that supports several of Salesforce's cloud services.

In 2019, Salesforce joined the Dow Jones Industrial Average, replacing energy giant and Standard Oil-descendant ExxonMobil. Salesforce's ascension to the Dow Jones was concurrent with that of Amgen and Honeywell. Because the Dow Jones factors its components by market price, Salesforce was the largest technology component of the index at its accession.

Across 2020 and 2021, Salesforce saw some notable leadership changes; in February 2020, co-chief executive officer Keith Block stepped down from his position in the company. Marc Benioff remained as chairman and chief executive officer. In February 2021, Amy Weaver, previously the chief legal officer, became CFO. Former CFO Mark Hawkins announced that he would be retiring in October. In November 2021, Bret Taylor was named vice chair and co-CEO of the company.

In December 2020, it was announced that Salesforce would acquire Slack for $27.7 billion, its largest acquisition to date. The acquisition closed in July 2021. Journalists covering the acquisition emphasized the price Salesforce paid for Slack, which was a 54% premium compared to Slack's market value, as too high of a premium for the company, with views varying from the premium being too concerning for investors to Salesforce playing the long game.

In August 2022, Salesforce reported second-quarter earnings of $7.72 billion. Upon the German software firm SAP reporting its earnings for the same quarter totaling €7.52 Billion, Acceleration Economy reported that Salesforce had surpassed SAP to become the world's largest enterprise software vendor. This mirrored Benioff's remarks in Salesforce's earnings call, where he stated he looked at "this quarter very much as kind of a milestone".

Salesforce announced a partnership with Meta Platforms in September 2022. The deal called that Meta's consumer application WhatsApp would integrate Salesforce's Customer 360 platform to allow consumers to communicate with companies directly.

In November 2022, Salesforce announced it would terminate employees in its sales organization. Protocol reported that the company would likely eliminate some 2500 jobs.

In November 2022, Salesforce announced its co-CEO and vice chair, Bret Taylor, would be stepping down from his roles at the end of January 2023, with Benioff continuing to run the company and serve as board chair. Within the week, former Tableau CEO Mark Nelson and former Slack CEO Stewart Butterfield also announced their departures. When asked about the departures, Benioff remained defiant and stated, "people come and people go"; Salesforce's stock dropped to a 52-week low after Nelson's resignation.

In January 2023, the company announced a layoff of about 10% or approximately 8,000 positions. According to Benioff, the company hired too aggressively during the COVID-19 pandemic and the increase in working from home. The company will also reduce office space as part of the restructuring plan. The same month brought an announcement from activist investor Elliott Management that it would acquire a "big stake" in the company.

Services
Salesforce's products include several customer relationship management (CRM) technologies, including: Sales Cloud, Service Cloud, Marketing Cloud, and Commerce Cloud and Platform. Additional technologies include Slack, MuleSoft, Tableau Analytics, and Trailhead.

Main services 
Salesforce's main technologies are tools for customer management. Other products enable customers to create apps, integrate data from other systems, visualize data, and offer training courses.

Salesforce Platform 
Salesforce Platform (formerly known as Force.com) is a platform as a service (PaaS) that allows developers to create add-on applications that integrate into the main Salesforce.com application. These third-party applications are hosted on Salesforce.com's infrastructure.

Force.com applications are built using declarative tools, backed by Lightning and Apex, a proprietary Java-like programming language for Force.com, as well as Visualforce, a framework including an XML syntax typically used to generate HTML. The Force.com platform typically receives three complete releases a year. As the platform is provided as a service to its developers, every single development instance also receives all these updates.

In 2015, a new framework for building user interfaces – Lightning Components – was introduced in beta. Lightning components are built using the open-source Aura Framework but with support for Apex as the server-side language instead of Aura's JavaScript dependency.

As of 2014, the Force.com platform has 1.5 million registered developers.

Lightning Base Components is the component library built on top of Lightning Web Components.

AppExchange 
Launched in 2005, the Salesforce AppExchange is an online application marketplace that connects customers with third-party applications and consulting services. As of 2021, the exchange has over 5,000 apps listed.

Trailhead 
Launched in 2014, Trailhead is a free online learning platform with courses focused on Salesforce technologies.

Salesforce+ 
In August 2021, during the COVID-19 pandemic, Salesforce launched a streaming service titled Salesforce+. The service features original content produced by the company involving its clients ranging from "days in the life" of smaller business owners to interviews with large companies' CEOs. Since 2022, Salesforce has also streamed its annual Dreamforce conference on Salesforce+.

Discontinued

Desk.com
Desk.com is a SaaS help desk and customer support product that was acquired by Salesforce for $50 million in 2011. The product focused on connecting small businesses to their customers.

In March 2018, Salesforce announced that Desk.com would be consolidated with other services into Service Cloud Essentials.

Do.com
Do.com was a cloud-based task management system for small groups and businesses, introduced in 2011, and discontinued in 2014.

Operations

Salesforce is headquartered in San Francisco in the Salesforce Tower. Salesforce has 110 offices, including ones in Hong Kong, Israel, London, Paris, Sydney, and Tokyo.

Standard & Poor's added Salesforce to the S&P 500 Index in September 2008. In August 2020, S&P Dow Jones Indices announced that Salesforce would replace Exxon Mobil in the Dow Jones Industrial Average.

Culture
According to Marc Benioff, Salesforce corporate culture is based on the concept of Ohana.

In 2021, Cynthia Perry, a design research senior manager, resigned over discrimination in the workplace and posted her resignation letter on LinkedIn.

On September 10, 2021, Benioff tweeted that the company is prepared to help any employee who wishes to move out of the state of Texas, following the abortion in Texas legislation announced on September 1, 2021.

Finances
For the fiscal year 2022, Salesforce reported revenue of US$26.49 billion, an increase of 25% year-over-year and 24% in constant currency. Salesforce ranked 126 on the 2022 Fortune 500 list of the largest United States companies by revenue.

IT infrastructure
Salesforce migrated to Dell servers with Advanced Micro Devices processors running Linux from Sun Fire E25K servers with SPARC processors running Solaris in 2008.

In 2012, Salesforce announced plans to build a data center in the UK to handle European citizens' personal data. The center opened in 2014.

In 2013, Salesforce and Oracle announced a nine-year partnership focusing on applications, platforms, and infrastructure.

In 2016, Salesforce announced that it will use Amazon Web Services hosting for countries with restrictive data residency requirements and where no Salesforce data centers are operating.

Acquisitions
Salesforce has acquired many companies throughout its history.

2006–2015 
In 2006, Salesforce acquired Sendia, a mobile web service firm, for $15 million and Kieden, an online advertising company. In 2007, Koral, a content management service, was acquired. In 2008, Salesforce acquired Instranet for $31.5 million. In 2010, Salesforce acquired multiple companies, including Jigsaw, a cloud-based data service provider, for $142 million, Heroku, a Ruby application platform-as-a-service, for $212 million, and Activa Live Chat, a live chat software provider. 
In 2011, Salesforce acquired Dimdim, a web conferencing platform, for $31 million, Radian6, a social media tracking company, for $340 million, and Rypple, a performance management software company. Rypple became known as Work.com in 2012. In 2012, Salesforce acquired Buddy Media, a social media marketer, for $689 million, and GoInstant, a browser collaboration startup, for $70 million.

In 2013, Salesforce acquired ExactTarget, an email marketer, for $2.5 billion. In 2014, Salesforce acquired RelateIQ, a data company, for $390 million. In 2015, Salesforce acquired multiple companies for undisclosed sums, including Toopher, a mobile authentication company, Tempo, an AI calendar app, and MinHash, an AI platform. The company also acquired SteelBrick, a software company, for $360 million.

2016–present 
In 2016, Salesforce spent over $5 billion in acquisitions. Companies acquired included Demandware, a cloud-based provider of e-commerce services, for $2.8 billion and Quip, a word processing app, for $750 million. In 2017, the company acquired Sequence, a user experience design agency, for an undisclosed amount.  In 2018, Salesforce acquired several companies, including MuleSoft, a cloud service company, for $6.5 billion, as well as Rebel, an email services provider, and Datorama, an AI marketing platform, for undisclosed amounts.

Between 2019 and 2021, Salesforce made two of its largest acquisitions, with Salesforce completing its acquisition Tableau, a data visualization and analytics software company, for $15.7 billion in 2019, and Slack Technologies, the developers of its namesake office messaging platform, for $27.7 billion in 2021. Salesforce also made smaller acquisitions throughout 2019, 2020, and 2021, which included ClickSoftware for $1.35 billion, consulting firm Acumen Solutions for $570 million, CRM firm Vlocity for $1.33 billion, privacy compliance startup Phennecs for $16.5 million, and robotic process automation firm Servicetrace for an undisclosed amount.

Salesforce's most recent acquisition was Slack-bot maker Troops.ai, announced in May 2022, and expected to close in 2023.

Criticisms

Subject to a phishing attack

In November 2007, a phishing attack compromised contact information on a number of Salesforce customers. Some customers then received phishing emails that appeared to be invoices from Salesforce. Salesforce stated that "a phisher tricked someone into disclosing a password, but this intrusion did not stem from a security flaw in [the salesforce.com] application or database."

‘Meatpistol’ presenters let go at Def Con

In 2017, at DEF CON, two security engineers were let go after giving a presentation on an internal project called MEATPISTOL. The presenters were sent a message 30 minutes prior to the presentation telling them not to go on stage, but the message wasn't seen until after they finished. The MEATPISTOL tool was anticipated to be released as open-source at the time of the presentation, but Salesforce didn't release the code to developers or the public during the conference. The terminated employees called on the company to open-source the software after being let go.

RAICES donation refusal

The not-for-profit organization Refugee and Immigrant Center for Education and Legal Services (RAICES) rejected a US$250,000 donation from Salesforce because the company has contracts with U.S. Customs and Border Protection.

2018 taxes
In December 2019, the Institute on Taxation and Economic Policy found that Salesforce was one of 91 companies who "paid an effective federal tax rate of 0% or less" in 2018, as a result of the Tax Cuts and Jobs Act of 2017. Their findings were published in a report based on the 379 Fortune 500 companies that declared a profit in 2018.

Lawsuit
In March 2019, Salesforce faced a lawsuit by 50 anonymous women claiming to be victims and survivors of sex trafficking, abuse, and rape. The suit alleges that the company profited from and helped build technology that facilitated sex trafficking on Backpage.com, a now defunct website. In March 2021, a judge granted partial dismissal of the case, dismissing charges of negligence and conspiracy, but allowed the case to proceed regarding charges of sex trafficking.

Disability discrimination lawsuit in Japan

In July 2021, Salesforce Japan faced a discrimination lawsuit from a former employee, according to Japanese legal media, . The firm declined to comment on the suit to the media. The ex-employee, who has Autism Spectrum Disorder and ADHD, claimed she was discriminated against because of her disability and terminated in the firm’s Japan web marketing team.
The suit alleged that the anonymous woman, as an employee at Salesforce Japan from 2018 to 2020, faced hate speech, microaggressions and rejection of reasonable accommodation from the manager. She alleged that her attempts to resolve the problem were met with pressure from HR and job coach. The lawsuit started on September 15 in Tokyo district court. The 8th trial will open on November 14, 2022.

Employee layoffs/Matthew McConaughey’s salary
In January 2023, Salesforce reported that 8,000 employees had been laid off as a result of over-hiring during the Covid lockdown and a global economic downturn. In March 2023, the Wall Street Journal reported that actor Matthew McConaughey was paid 10 million dollars yearly for his role as a “creative advisor and TV pitchman”. American musician will.i.am was also cited to be on the company’s payroll due to his “strong understanding of technology”.

Salesforce Ventures
In 2009, Salesforce began investing in startups. These investments became Salesforce Ventures, headed by John Somorjai In September 2014, SFV set up Salesforce1 Fund, aimed at start-ups creating applications primarily for mobile phones. In December 2018, Salesforce Ventures announced the launch of the Japan Trailblazer Fund, focused on Japanese startups.

In August 2018, Salesforce Ventures reported investments totaling over $1 billion in 275 companies, including CloudCraze (e-commerce), Figure Eight (artificial intelligence), Forter (online fraud prevention), and FinancialForce (automation software). In 2019, SFV's five largest investments—Domo (data-visualization software), SurveyMonkey (online survey software), Twilio (cloud-communication), Dropbox (cloud storage), and DocuSign (secure e-signature company)—accounted for nearly half of its portfolio. In 2021, Salesforce announced that its investments had resulted in $2.17 billion annual gain.

See also
 Salesforce Tower
 Salesforce Tower Indianapolis
 Salesforce Marketing Cloud
 SalesforceIQ
 Slack

Notes

References

External links

 
2004 initial public offerings
Companies listed on the New York Stock Exchange
Companies in the Dow Jones Industrial Average
Customer relationship management software companies
Customer relationship management software
Software companies based in the San Francisco Bay Area
Companies based in San Francisco
Software companies established in 1999
Cloud applications
Cloud computing providers
1999 establishments in California
American companies established in 1999
Software companies of the United States
Low Code Application Platform